Grady C. Cothen, Sr. (2 August 1920 – 19 May 2017), was a pastor, state convention executive secretary-director for the Southern Baptist Convention, author, university president, and seminary president.

Cothen was born in Poplarville, Mississippi, to the Reverend and Mrs. J. H. Cothen. He married Martha E. (Bettye) Major and had two children; Grady, Jr., Carole Shields.

He attended from Hattiesburg High School, graduated from Baptist-affiliated Mississippi College in Clinton and received his master's degree from New Orleans Baptist Theological Seminary. He was ordained into Baptist ministry in 1939 in Richton, Mississippi. Cothen died on 19 May 2017 in Ridgeland, Mississippi, at the age of ninety-six.

Service
 Chaplain, U. S. Navy, 1944–46
 Pastor: White Oak Baptist Church, Chattanooga, Tn. 1946-48
 Olivet Baptist Church, Oklahoma City, Ok. 1948-59
 First Baptist Church, Birmingham, Al. 1959-61
 Executive Secretary, Southern Baptist General Convention of Ca. 1961 – 1966.
 President of Oklahoma Baptist University 1966-70
 President of New Orleans Baptist Theological Seminary 1970-74
 President of Southern Baptist Sunday School Board 1975-84

Awards
 Distinguished Alumnus Award, New Orleans Baptist Theological Seminary
 Order of The Golden Arrow, Mississippi College
 E. Y. Mullins Denominational Service Award, Southern Baptist Theological Seminary
 Listed in Who's Who in America from 1970 until retirement.

Honorary degrees
 Doctor of Divinity, Mississippi College
 Doctor of Divinity, California Baptist College
 Doctor of Laws, William Jewell College
 Doctor of Humanities, University of Richmond
 Doctor of Humane Letters, Campbell University
 Doctor of Humane Letters, Oklahoma Baptist University

Books
 The God of The Beginnings
 Faith and Higher Education
 Unto All The World: Bold Mission
 What Happened to The Southern Baptist Convention?
 The New SBC: Fundamentalism's Impact on The Southern Baptist Convention

President of OBU

During Cothen's tenure as president the Howard Residence was completed, the Oklahoma Baptist University Authority was incorporated, the National Council for Accreditation of Teacher Education accredited all OBU programs, and The Geiger Center for University Life was completed.

References

External links 
 The Papers of Grady C. Cothen
 Oklahoma Baptist University Archives
 JSTOR: Journal for Scientific Study of Religion
 Council for Christian Colleges and Universities 

1920 births
2017 deaths
Mississippi College alumni
Presidents of Oklahoma Baptist University
New Orleans Baptist Theological Seminary alumni
Baptist writers
United States Navy chaplains
United States Navy officers
United States Navy personnel of World War II
Burials in Tennessee
People from Poplarville, Mississippi
Southern Baptist ministers
Baptists from Mississippi